The Army Group German Crown Prince or Army Group B was an Army Group of the German Army, which operated on the Western Front under command of Wilhelm, German Crown Prince, between 1 August 1915 and 11 November 1918 during World War I.

Composition (1 August 1915 – April 1917) 
 German 5th Army (Wilhelm, German Crown Prince then Ewald von Lochow then Max von Gallwitz)
 German Armee-Abteilung A (Ludwig von Falkenhausen then Karl Ludwig d'Elsa then Bruno von Mudra)
 German Armee-Abteilung B (Hans Gaede then Erich von Gündell)
 German Armee-Abteilung C (Hermann von Strantz then Max von Boehn)
 German 3rd Army (Karl von Einem) : 26 September - 7 December 1915 and again since July 1916

Composition (April 1917 – February 1918) 
 German 7th Army (Max von Boehn)
 German 1st Army (Fritz von Below)
 German 3rd Army (Karl von Einem)
 German 5th Army (Max von Gallwitz)

Composition (4 February 1918 – 11 November 1918) 
 German 18th Army (Oskar von Hutier) : except 12 August - 8 October 1918
 German 7th Army (Max von Boehn then Magnus von Eberhardt)
 German 1st Army (Fritz von Below then Bruno von Mudra then Otto von Below then Magnus von Eberhardt)
 German 3rd Army (Karl von Einem)

Sources
The Soldier's Burden
Die Deutschen Heeresgruppen im Ersten Weltkrieg
: Die deutschen Heeresgruppen Teil 1, Erster Weltkrieg

Army groups of the Imperial German Army
Military units and formations of Germany in World War I
Military units and formations established in 1915
Military units and formations disestablished in 1918